George Washington Bradford (May 9, 1796 Otsego, Otsego County, New York – October 31, 1883 Syracuse, Onondaga County, New York) was an American physician and politician from New York.

Life
He was the son of Eseck Bradford and Hulda (Skinner) Bradford. He studied medicine in Cooperstown, was licensed to practice in 1819, and commenced practice in Homer. He married Mary Ann Walker, and they had three children.

He was a member of the New York State Assembly (Cortland Co.) in 1852.

He was a member of the New York State Senate (23rd D.) from 1854 to 1857, sitting in the 77th, 78th, 79th and 80th New York State Legislatures. He was the author of the Prohibition law passed by the Legislature in 1854, which was however declared unconstitutional by the New York Court of Appeals in 1855.

Sources
The New York Civil List compiled by Franklin Benjamin Hough (pages 137, 139, 242 and 260; Weed, Parsons and Co., 1858)
Pen and Ink Portraits of the Senators, Assemblymen, and State Officers of New York by G. W. Bungay (1857; pg. 11)
George Washington Bradford at Ancestry.com

1796 births
1883 deaths
Members of the New York State Assembly
New York (state) state senators
New York (state) Republicans
People from Homer, New York
People from Otsego, New York
New York (state) Whigs
19th-century American politicians
19th-century American physicians
People from Cooperstown, New York